The San Quentin Six were six inmates at San Quentin State Prison in the U.S. state of California who were charged with actions related to an August 21, 1971 escape attempt that resulted in six deaths and at least two persons seriously wounded. They were Fleeta Drumgo, David Johnson, Hugo Pinell, Johnny Larry Spain, Willie Tate, and Luis Talamantez. The dead included George Jackson, a co-founder of the Black Guerrilla Family; two other inmates, and three guards.

The trial of the six men cost more than $2 million and lasted 16 months: the longest in the state's history at the time. It was dubbed "The Longest Trial" by Time magazine. Of the six defendants, one was convicted of murder, two were convicted of assault on correctional officers, and three were acquitted of all charges.

During the escape, which sparked a prison riot on the cellblock, Jackson had possession of a .32 caliber pistol allegedly smuggled into the prison by his attorney Stephen Bingham. Immediately after the incident, Bingham fled the country for 13 years. He returned in 1984 to stand trial, and was acquitted of all charges in 1986. Bingham's defense had argued that guards had smuggled the gun to George Jackson, hoping that he would be killed if he used it. 

In addition to Jackson, those killed in the altercation were guards Paul E. Krasenes, 52, Frank DeLeon, 44, and Jere P. Graham, 39, and inmates John Lynn, 29, and Ronald L. Kane, 28. Two other officers suffered serious injuries.

Spain was found guilty in the shooting deaths of guards DeLeon and Graham. Pinell was convicted of cutting the throats of guards Charles Breckenridge and Urbano Rubiaco, Jr., both of whom survived. Johnson was convicted of assaulting Breckenridge. There were no convictions for the killings of Krasenes, Lynn, or Kane. Drumgo, Talamantaz, and Tate were found not guilty of all charges, including various counts of murder, conspiracy, and assault.

Riot of August 21, 1971

The details about what happened are disputed to this day. Inmate Johnny Spain at the Adjustment Center recalled saying one fact people could agree on was that "There was a gun introduced into the Adjustment Center on August 21." 

The state first said that attorney Stephen Bingham and a female assistant arrived at San Quentin for a meeting with George Jackson at around 2:00 pm. The assistant handed a briefcase to Bingham when she was not permitted to enter the visiting room.

According to an Associated Press report based on interviews with prison officials, a cursory search of Bingham's briefcase was performed and a guard failed to open a tape recorder case that was in it. This report said that the briefcase was returned to Bingham after he walked through a metal detector. The San Francisco Chronicle reported, based on officials' accounts, that Bingham had triggered the metal detector while carrying the briefcase through it. That report said that an officer opened the briefcase and found a cassette tape recorder; he inspected its battery compartment to determine whether it was functional. Prison officials later came to believe that the working components of the recorder had been removed to allow room for an automatic handgun with its grip handles removed. Initial reports described the weapon as a 9 mm pistol made by the Spanish manufacturer Llama firearms. 

Another account suggested that George Jackson assembled the gun himself with parts that were smuggled in and thrown over to the Adjustment Center yard. Most evidence indicates that the gun was smuggled into the prison already assembled, along with some "faint messages" found in Jackson's cell. After the uprising, prison officials found notes in his cell that read "Take the bullets out of the bag", "Hurry and give me the piece in the bag. Keep the bullets".

Before the scheduled meeting with his attorney, Jackson was strip searched in the Adjustment Center, then escorted to the visiting room. He sat across from Bingham at a wooden table that lacked barriers between the two; they were intermittently observed by guards. Officials speculated that during this time, Bingham passed the gun to Jackson, who concealed it in his hair under a watch cap. The meeting lasted about 15 minutes. Around 2:35 pm, Jackson was escorted by officer Frank DeLeon back to the Adjustment Center, where another officer performed a second search prior to returning Jackson to his cell. When that officer asked Jackson about what appeared to be a pencil in his hair, Jackson pulled the gun out, pointed it at the officers, and inserted a magazine. He reportedly shouted, "This is it!", and ordered all of the officers to lie face down on the floor. Jackson ordered one officer to get up and activate a switch that opened all 34 cells on the first floor. 

After Jackson had successfully released the convicts, he repeatedly shouted, "The dragon has come." As calls for help went out, heavily armed California Highway Patrolmen and Marin County Sheriff's deputies raced to the prison, blocking all access roads to it. George Jackson said, "It's me who they want" and ran with the gun in hand next to Johnny Spain into the prison "plaza". Jackson was immediately gunned down. The marksman shot him in the back, where the bullet bounced from his spine or pelvis and exited through his skull.

According to the Chronicle, an inmate slashed the throat of officer Charles Breckenridge and dragged him to Jackson's cell; Breckenridge survived. The bodies of officers Frank DeLeon and Paul Krasenes were thrown on top of him, as well as those of two white inmates (John Lynn and Ronald L. Kane). Sergeant Jere Graham was killed by inmates when he came to the Adjustment Center to pick up DeLeon for another assignment. 

After the revolt had ended, 26 captured prisoners were forced to lie face down, stripped naked and confined in handcuffs and shackles. Within the following days, they were repeatedly beaten by guards and officers. Those who survived the riot were constantly tormented, threatened, and beaten at the hands of Warden, Louis S. Nelson. Guards told them, "None of you will ever leave here alive".

Trial
There are disputes about the events on August 21, 1971, related to the weapon and other elements of the riot. Legal advisers and prison officials gave various accounts as they struggled to learn what had happened. After multiple revisions, authorities identified the gun as a 9mm Astra M-600, which is almost 9 inches long and weighs approximately 2.5 pounds. Another scenario suggests the guards at San Quentin received a non-functioning weapon with a filed-down firing pin, from either Criminal Investigation and Identification Department of the state attorney general's office, or the Criminal Conspiracy Section of the Los Angeles Police Department (LAPD). 

Analysts said that the 9mm found next to Jackson's body would have been too large to fit within Bingham's tape recorder, or under Jackson's cap. The Department of Corrections then said the weapon was a .38 caliber Llama Corto. 

At the trial, Louis Tackwood said that the gun he took to the prison was a .25 caliber revolver. Attorney Charles Garry said that the escape theory was "garbage", and insisted that the riot was due to emotional unrest and had nothing to do with inmates trying to escape. During the trial, Tate was freed on $50,000 bail. 

Defense attorneys presented a conspiracy theory suggesting that prison and law enforcement officials set up Jackson to be killed. The prosecution asserted that the escape attempt was a conspiracy that involved radicals sympathetic to Jackson.

After 17 months and deliberating 124 days, the Marin County jury of five men and seven women rendered their verdicts on August 12, 1976, for 6  of the 46 separate felony counts. David Johnson was convicted of one count of felony assault on a guard, Hugo Pinell for two counts of felony assault on a guard, and Johnny Spain for two counts of first degree murder and conspiracy to commit murder. 

Spain's convictions were reversed on appeal in 1989. The convictions were based on testimony of numerous  eyewitnesses, but individual responsibility for certain charges were debated. Marin County Superior Court Judge Henry J. Broderick spent 45 minutes reading the verdicts. The trial ended as the longest in California history, during which 23,000 pages of testimony were collected. 

In the aftermath of events, the Department of Corrections made a number of changes at San Quentin.  The defense attorneys had been able to argue that various law enforcement agencies had set up a plan to murder an African-American political prisoner and, in the process frame 6 innocent inmates in other assaults. While not conclusive, such evidence promoted distrust toward the state, LAPD, and corrections officials.

San Quentin Six

Fleeta Drumgo
Fleeta Drumgo (1945 – November 26, 1979) was born to Inez Williams in Shreveport, Louisiana.

According to the Daily Review (Hayward, California), Drumgo moved to Los Angeles with his mother at the age of three. His childhood was difficult, and he had been in and out of juvenile detention homes since the age of 13. According to Fania Davis Jordan, sister of activist Angela Davis, Drumgo moved to Los Angeles at the age of 14 and got crosswise with the justice system. He was placed in the Preston School of Industry. After his release, he was arrested in a new incident, for attempted murder. He was convicted and sentenced to the Deuel Vocational Institution near Tracy, California.

Drumgo was later charged with the December 1966 burglary of a television and radio store in the Los Angeles suburb of South Gate. According to court documents, Drumgo initially admitted his involvement in the break-in after officers found him at the address of the registration of the getaway car used by his accomplice. In early 1967, he was convicted of first degree burglary after waiving a jury trial. He was referred to the California Youth Authority, but they ruled that he was "not capable of reformation under their discipline".

In September 1967, the court, pursuant to California Penal Code, reduced Drumgo's previous conviction to secondary burglary and sentenced him to six months to 15 years in state prison.

Jackson, Drumgo, and John Clutchette were among the Soledad Brothers indicted for the 1970 killing of a correctional officer at Soledad Prison. The trio gained national notoriety about this case after Jackson published his memoir Soledad Brother. They were acquitted at trial in 1972. Twice charged and acquitted for the murder of prison guards, Drumgo was released from prison in August 1976. He had served nine years for the burglary charge.

According to Peter Collier and David Horowitz, Drumgo approached attorney Charles Garry two weeks after the May 1979 shooting of Fay Stender by alleged suspect Edward Brooks; he hoped  to sell information he had regarding the attempted murder. Collier and Horowitz wrote: "[Drumgo] was a member of the Black Guerrilla Family, that he had known of the BGF's plans to shoot Fay two weeks before the event and that he was willing to sell information. He reappeared on several occasions, sometimes wearing a gun in his belt, and named a former prisonmate of Brooks as head of the BGF and the man who had ordered the shooting."

Drumgo was fatally shot in Oakland on November 26, 1979; he was living with Clutchette at the time. According to Oakland police, Drumgo had been shot by more than one weapon. Witnesses reported two men leaving the scene, one with a shotgun and one with a handgun. His killers were never caught.

At his funeral, Drumgo was eulogized by Angela Davis as a "communist martyr".

David Johnson
David Johnson (born circa 1947) was serving a sentence for burglary of five years to life at the time of the escape attempt. During the resulting trial,  guard Charles Breckenridge testified that Johnson had attempted to strangle him. On August 12, 1976, Johnson was convicted on one count of assault. He was released from prison in 1993.

Hugo Pinell
Hugo Pinell was born March 10, 1945, in Nicaragua. His family immigrated to the US. He died in prison at age 70, after being stabbed on August 12, 2015, by two other inmates (members of the Aryan Brotherhood) at New Folsom Prison.

In 1965, Pinell was convicted of rape in San Francisco, sentenced to life imprisonment, and assigned to San Quentin State Prison. In 1968, he was convicted of attacking a guard and transferred to Folsom State Prison.

In June 1970, he was convicted of a similar assault and transferred to the California Correctional Center in Soledad, California. At Soledad, he was awaiting trial on charges of attacking another guard in December 1970. On March 3, 1971, Pinell fatally stabbed correctional officer Robert J. McCarthey at Soledad after luring him to his cell under the guise of needing a letter mailed. McCarthey died in Fort Ord Army Hospital two days later.

By the time of the trial for the uprising at San Quentin, Pinell was serving a life sentence for rape, and for three other violent offenses committed while in prison. Pinell was reported by a San Quentin spokesman to have been subdued by guards on March 26, 1975, after he stabbed his defense attorney, Lynn Carman, during a conference at the prison. Carman denied having been stabbed or wounded, and declined additional comment on the matter. One witness to the incident reported that Carman was left bleeding from the mouth.

During the trial, two San Quentin guards, Charles Breckenridge and Urbano Rubiaco, Jr., testified that Pinell had cut their throats. On August 12, 1976, Pinell was convicted of two counts of felony assault by a prisoner serving a sentence for life imprisonment. In 1985, he was serving his sentence in Folsom State Prison.
In January 2009, Pinell lost his ninth bid for parole, while at Pelican Bay State Prison in Crescent City, California. His prison term was extended by another 15 years. 

On August 12, 2015, Pinell, aged 70, was killed in a prison riot at New Folsom Prison. Because of his repeated assaults on officers, he had been kept in solitary confinement for almost 45 years. He was returned to the general population two weeks before he was killed.

Johnny Spain
Johnny Larry Spain was born July 30, 1949, in Jackson, Mississippi, to Ann Armstrong, a white woman, and Arthur Cummings, a black man, from their extra-marital affair. He was named Larry Michael Armstrong, given the surname of his mother's husband, Fred Armstrong, a beer truck driver.

During a delivery to a nightclub and restaurant in Utica, Mississippi, Fred Armstrong asked the black owner if she would take in the six-year-old mixed-race boy. The woman said she could not, but contacted her husband's cousin in California, who agreed to do so. At the age of six, Spain was adopted by Johnny and Helen Spain in Los Angeles, and he was renamed as Johnny Larry Spain. 

At the time of the escape attempt at San Quentin, Spain was serving a life sentence for murder; he was convicted of having killed a robbery victim who resisted. Spain's attorney Charles Garry opened his defense with expert testimony from Philip Zimbardo, a Stanford University professor and psychologist.

On August 12, 1976, Spain was convicted of two counts of first degree murder and conspiracy to commit murder in the deaths of guards Frank DeLeon and Jere P. Graham. He was the only one of the Six convicted of murder. The conviction was overturned on appeal by federal judge Thelton Henderson, because Spain had been shackled throughout the proceedings, which could have biased the jury against him.

After his conviction for the San Quentin escape was overturned, Spain continued to serve time at Vacaville for his original murder. He was paroled in 1988 after serving 21 years. He found work in community relations in San Francisco. Spain has a daughter, Sahara Sunday Spain. 

Professor and author Lori Andrews published a biography about him: Black Power, White Blood: The Life and Times of Johnny Spain(1996). She taught at the Chicago-Kent College of Law.

Luis Talamantez
Luis Talamantez was born circa 1943. In February 1966, he was convicted of armed robbery in Los Angeles.

Talamantez was acquitted in 1971 of the murder charge related to San Quentin. He served 5 more years of his sentence for the 1966 armed robbery. After being released on parole on August 20, 1976, he was taken to a celebration party at the home of his primary defense attorney, Robert Carrow, in Marin County. In 1985, Talamantez was reported to be "living in the South".

Willie Tate
Willie Tate was born circa 1944 or 1945 in Selma, Alabama, where he lived until he was six years old. His father was a sergeant in the United States Army. The family moved to El Paso, Texas. However, Tate could not attend school as there was no kindergarten or first grade for black children. The family moved to California and settled in Fresno when he was about eight years old.

According to the San Francisco Bay Guardian, Tate was picked up as a runaway at the age of 14 and served 10 years in prison for "minor offenses".

On April 26, 1977, Tate was critically wounded after being shot by Earl Satcher, the leader of a group of ex-convicts called Tribal Thumb. In 1985, Tate was reported to be a "fugitive on a Fresno drug warrant".

References

Quantified groups of defendants
20th-century American trials
1971 in California